Parekh & Singh are an Indian dream pop duo from the city of Kolkata in the Indian state of West Bengal. The duo consists of Nischay Parekh (vocals, guitar, synths) and Jivraj Singh (drums, electronics).

History

Background 
The two met as teenagers, although they had both attended La Martiniere for Boys. Parekh, who was introduced to pop music by his mother, attended classes at the Berklee College of Music in Boston, Massachusetts, United States, before returning to India and relocating to Kolkata to pursue a career in music and songwriting. Singh, meanwhile, was raised in a musical household; with both parents being singers and musicians that would often tour and perform in cover bands. Prior to the two playing together, Parekh sang and played guitar in a self-described "experimental pop" band, The Monkey In Me. The band formed in 2009, while Parekh was still in high school.

Formation, early years and Ocean (2011–2015) 
Initially, the duo performed under the banner of Nischay Parekh in 2011. Although it was ostensibly Parekh's solo project, Singh was a constant collaborator and appeared alongside Parekh for photos and performances. They released an album, Ocean, independently in 2013. The album featured contributions from Singh on drums and percussion, Pedro Zappa on bass and George Matthew Dylan Varner-Hartley (AKA George Dylan) on piano and keyboards. Ocean was well-received in India, with Rolling Stone India naming it as one of the best Indian albums of the year. Two singles were released from the album: "I Love You Baby, I Love You Doll" and "Panda." The duo were then briefly known as Zap in 2014, before changing their name to Parekh & Singh in 2015; inspired by acts such as Simon & Garfunkel and Hall & Oates. By this point, bassist Zappa had moved on to other projects and keyboardist Varner-Hartley had relocated to Canada; thus officially making the project a duo again.

Ocean re-release (2015–2017) 
The band re-released Ocean under their new name in October 2016 on Peacefrog, a British indie label. Parekh & Singh then re-released the single "I Love You Baby, I Love You Doll." Its music video, which was shot on a US$5000 (INR₹322324) budget, features an aesthetic influenced by the American film director Wes Anderson. It has since garnered over 2,000,000 views on YouTube, considered to be a significant feat for an Indian indie band. Two more singles were released from the album: "Philosophize" in November 2016, and "Ghost" in May 2017.

Science City (2018–present) 

Parekh & Singh finished touring in support of Ocean in February 2018. A month later, the band posted to Facebook to state that new music was imminent. In November 2018, after several teasers via social media, the band released a new single entitled "Summer Skin." The song was premiered on VICE India, and was later selected as one of Rolling Stone India'''s favourite songs of the year. A music video for the song was released in January 2019, which has since accumulated over 100,000 views.

On January 26, 2019, the band released the single "Hello." It was then revealed that both it and "Summer Skin" would be a part of the band's second studio album. The album is titled Science City, named after an amusement park in Kolkata. The album was released on April 26 via Peacefrog Records. A third single, entitled "Crystalline," was released on March 15.

Discography

AlbumsOcean (2013; re-released 2016 as Parekh & Singh)Science City (2019)The Night is Clear'' (2022)

Singles

"I Love You Baby, I Love You Doll" (2013; re-released 2016)
"Panda" (2014)
"Philosophize" (2016)
"Ghost" (2017)
"Summer Skin" (2018)
"Hello" (2019)
"Crystalline" (2019)
"Drum Machine" (2019)
"Chhan Chhan Chhan" with Kamakshi Khanna (2022)
"Je Suis la Pomme Rouge" (2022)
"Sleepyhead" (2022)
"The Nightingale" (2022)

References

Indian pop music groups
Peacefrog Records artists